Nina Ellen Riggs (March 29, 1977 – February 26, 2017) was an American writer and poet.  Her best known work is her memoir, The Bright Hour, detailing her journey as a mother with incurable breast cancer.  It was published shortly after her death.  The book received critical acclaim. Riggs also contributed an article to New York Times series Modern Love.

Riggs was born in San Francisco, California. She was the great-great-great granddaughter of Ralph Waldo Emerson. She received a bachelor's degree in creative writing from the University of North Carolina at Chapel Hill and a master of fine arts degree in poetry from UNC at Greensboro.

Riggs was married to John Duberstein, an attorney with whom she had two sons.  They lived in Greensboro, North Carolina.

Bibliography

The Bright Hour (2017) 
The Bright Hour was published June 6, 2017 by Simon & Schuster. The book was a New York Times Best Seller and received starred reviews from Kirkus Reviews, Publishers Weekly, and Library Journal. It was also selected as one of the best books of 2017 by 

The book was well-received:

 2017 Goodreads Choice Award Nominee for Memoir & Autobiography 
 Best Books of 2017 by The Washington Post, O Magazine, NPR, Bitch, and Medium
 Most Anticipated Summer Reading Selection by The Washington Post, Entertainment Weekly, Glamour, The Seattle Times, Vulture, InStyle, Bookpage, Bookriot, Real Simple, and The Atlanta Journal-Constitution

Lucky, Lucky (2009) 
Lucky, Lucky, a poetry chapbook, was published in 2009 by Finishing Line Press.

References

1977 births
2017 deaths
University of North Carolina alumni
Writers from North Carolina
American women writers
People from Greensboro, North Carolina
Deaths from breast cancer
21st-century American women